Kathryn Ann Busby is an American film executive, who has been senior vice president of development at Sony Pictures Television Networks (SPT), executive vice president of TriStar Television, and most recently President of Original Programming at Starz, announced in November 2021. Sometimes credited as Kathy Busby, she is also a film producer. She was elected chair of the board of directors of BAFTA Los Angeles as of 2019, and in January 2022 was announced as chair of BAFTA's inaugural North America Board.

Biography

Education and early work
Busby graduated magna cum laude from Harvard University with a B.A. in Visual and Environmental Studies. She worked in the record industry for several years as an executive at LaFace Records, Paisley Park Records, and MCA Records in London, UK.

Television career
Beginning a career in television, Busby was director of comedy development at Universal Television from 1996 to 1999.

From 1999 to 2005 she was senior vice president and head of development at Carsey-Werner, where she developed such television series as Whoopi, The Tracy Morgan Show, Game Over, and Grounded for Life. She was subsequently supervising producer for The Aisha Tyler Show and senior vice president of production at New Line Cinema, where she was executive producer on the 2008 film Sex and the City and senior executive on Rush Hour 3 (2007).

Busby worked for four years with Turner Broadcasting from 2010, as vice president of comedy development and vice president of TNT and TBS Originals, working on such shows as Black Box, Wedding Band and Sullivan & Son. In 2014, she joined Sony Pictures Television (SPT) Networks, where she was senior vice president of development, initiating and overseeing the sourcing, development and early production of original series around the world.

As senior vice president of the boutique production unit Gemstone Studios, she spearheaded the development and production of drama series such as Absentia, and oversaw the development of such projects as the local-language original series Ultraviolet and the series Carter (starring Jerry O'Connell and Sydney Poitier Heartsong), until in January 2020 being named executive vice president of TriStar Television, a division of SPT.

In November 2021, it was announced that Busby would be leaving the Sony television label to become President of Original Programming at Starz.

In January 2022, Busby was elected Chair of the inaugural BAFTA North America Board.

Other activities
Also a filmmaker, Busby's work includes having directed, produced and co-written the short film Max and Josh (2006), which premiered at the Sundance Film Festival, and the 2004 comedy short My Purple Fur Coat (winner of a Best Children's Short award at the Houston Black Film Festival). She co-authored with Neena Beber the original screenplay Her Gal Friday, which was optioned at ABC's Freeform channel.

Busby is on the Los Angeles board of directors for the British Academy of Film and Television Arts (BAFTA), of which she was elected deputy chair in January 2018, and chair in December 2018. She is also on the Board of Directors of PACE (Philanthropy and Community Engagement).

Busby features in the 1999 book by Julian C. R. Okwu As I Am: Young African American Women in a Critical Age. She is the niece of British publisher Margaret Busby.

Accolades
In December 2022, Busby was named on The Hollywood Reporters Women in Entertainment Power 100 list.

References

External links
 Nellie Andreeva, "Starz's Kathryn Busby On Expanding Diverse Storytelling, Re-Teaming With Sean Penn & 'Special' 'Party Down' Revival", Deadline, August 10, 2022.
 "Six of the best: Kathryn Busby", DQ (Drama Quarterly), April 30, 2018.
 "SPEECH - Kathryn Busby at BAFTA Tea Party in Los Angeles, CA 1/5/19". Getty Images.

Living people
21st-century African-American people
21st-century African-American women
African-American screenwriters
African-American television producers
African-American women writers
American television producers
American women film producers
American women screenwriters
American women television producers
Harvard University alumni
Sony Pictures Entertainment people
Year of birth missing (living people)